The Trawlerman's Song is an EP by British singer-songwriter and guitarist Mark Knopfler, released on 26 April 2005 by Mercury Records. The EP contains the album version of "The Trawlerman's Song" from the 2004 album Shangri-La and live in-studio versions of five other songs recorded in one take at Shangri-la Studios in Malibu, California.

Track listing
All songs were written by Mark Knopfler.

Personnel
Music
 Mark Knopfler – vocals, guitars
 Richard Bennett – guitars
 Jim Cox – keyboards
 Matt Rollings – keyboards
 Doug Pettibone – guitar (2,5), mandolin (8)
 Glenn Worf – bass
 Chad Cromwell – drums

Production
 Mark Knopfler – producer
 Chuck Ainlay – producer, engineer
 Rodney Pearson – digital editing
 Bob Ludwig – mastering

References

External links
 The Trawlerman's Song at Mark Knopfler official website

Mark Knopfler albums
2005 debut EPs
Albums recorded at Shangri-La (recording studio)